Oncideres albomaculata is a species of beetle in the family Cerambycidae. It was described by Dillon and Dillon in 1946. It is known from French Guiana and Brazil.

References

albomaculata
Beetles described in 1946